Norwich Airport  is a city-owned, public-use airport located one nautical mile (2 km) east of the central business district of Norwich, a city in Kingman County, Kansas, United States.

Facilities and aircraft 
Norwich Airport covers an area of 10 acres (4 ha) at an elevation of 1,494 feet (455 m) above mean sea level. It has one runway designated 17/35 with a turf surface measuring 3,230 by 80 feet (985 x 24 m).

For the 12-month period ending September 23, 2011, the airport had 470 general aviation aircraft operations, an average of 39 per month. At that time there were eight aircraft based at this airport: 75% single-engine and 25% ultralight.

References

External links 
 Norwich Airport (49K) at Kansas DOT Airport Directory
 Aerial image as of August 1991 from USGS The National Map
 

Airports in Kansas
Buildings and structures in Kingman County, Kansas